Murtaugh is a rural town in Twin Falls County, Idaho, United States. The population was 115 at the 2010 census, down from 139 in 2000. It is part of the Twin Falls, Idaho Micropolitan Statistical Area. Murtaugh has existed since at least the early 1950s, and is named after Mark Murtaugh, who oversaw a local irrigation project.

Geography

The community is located at a bend in U.S. Route 30.  Murtaugh Lake is south of town on the opposite side of US-30.

Demographics

2010 census
As of the census of 2010, there were 115 people, 43 households, and 30 families residing in the town. The racial makeup was 84.3% White, 14.8% from other races, and 0.9% from two or more races. Hispanic or Latino of any race were 20.0% of the population.

There were 43 households, of which 32.6% had children under the age of 18 living with them, 51.2% were married couples living together, 11.6% had a female householder with no husband present, 7.0% had a male householder with no wife present, and 30.2% were non-families. 27.9% of all households were made up of individuals, and 13.9% had someone living alone who was 65 years of age or older. The average household size was 2.67 and the average family size was 3.20.

The median age was 40.8 years. 24.3% of residents were under the age of 18; 7.8% were between the ages of 18 and 24; 22.6% were from 25 to 44; 30.4% were from 45 to 64; and 14.8% were 65 years of age or older. The gender makeup was 53.9% male and 46.1% female.

2000 census
As of the census of 2000, there were 139 people, 49 households, and 36 families residing in the town. The racial makeup was 91.37% White, 0.72% Native American, 5.76% from other races, and 2.16% from two or more races. Hispanic or Latino of any race were 6.47% of the population.

There were 49 households, out of which 36.7% had children under the age of 18 living with them, 67.3% were married couples living together, 6.1% had a female householder with no husband present, and 26.5% were non-families. 24.5% of all households were made up of individuals, and 12.2% had someone living alone who was 65 years of age or older. The average household size was 2.84 and the average family size was 3.39.

The population was spread out, with 32.4% under the age of 18, 4.3% from 18 to 24, 28.1% from 25 to 44, 17.3% from 45 to 64, and 18.0% who were 65 years of age or older. The median age was 38 years. For every 100 females, there were 117.2 males. For every 100 females age 18 and over, there were 104.3 males.

The median household income was $23,929, and the median family income was $25,313. Males had a median income of $21,875 versus $16,250 for females. The per capita income was $9,934. There were 12.8% of families and 15.8% of the population living below the poverty line, including 25.6% of under eighteens and none of those over 64.

References

Cities in Idaho
Cities in Twin Falls County, Idaho
Twin Falls, Idaho metropolitan area